Orato is an international news Web site that showcases first-person accounts from the protagonists and witnesses of events.

It was recognized as one of the top 12 news websites in the world by the 2008 Webby Awards, called the Oscars of the Internet by The New York Times, receiving approximately 10,000 visits per day, up to 55,000, from a mostly American demographic. 

Anybody can post a story at Orato as long as it is a demonstrably true story that follows Orato’s guidelines.

The name of the site comes from the Latin and it means "I speak". The idea of eyewitness accounts inspired Orato’s founder, Sam Yehia in the late 1990s to launch a citizen journalism site whose motto is: "True Stories From Real People”. Yehia said it is designed to be the “CNN of the individual”.

In 2000, following focus group and survey study analysis, an early version of Orato.com went online and was awarded "Yahoo Site of the Week". 

The site showcases stories from around the world. 

All of the stories are written by freelance contributors and ordinary citizens. A similar open-source perspective on news reporting has been explored by Wikinews, with the added distinction that any user can edit articles at any time, while in Orato, only editors can edit a story.

Story ideas come directly from correspondents or are based on assignments from Orato editors. Users can choose from 16 story categories, including Conflict, Crime & Corruption, Racism, Policing, Viruses, Whistleblower, and Visionaries. 

Orato’s contributors and correspondents registration site was initially launched in June 2005. The site with all its functionalities and sections was officially launched a year later, in June 2006.

The site was relaunched in September 2020.

See also

Blog
Participatory media
Independent Media Center
Local news
Open source journalism
Wikinews

External links
 

Canadian news websites
Citizen journalism